Ernest Walter Bennett (21 August 1879  – 11 August 1921) was an English professional rugby league footballer who played as a er in the 1890s and 1900s. 

He played at representative level for Yorkshire, and at club level for Wakefield Trinity (Heritage № 77).

Background
Ernest Bennett's birth was registered in Wakefield district, West Riding of Yorkshire, England.

Playing career

County honours
Ernest Bennett won cap(s) for Yorkshire while at Wakefield Trinity.

Challenge Cup Final appearances
Ernest Bennett played , i.e. number 2, and scored a try in Wakefield Trinity's 17-0 victory over Hull F.C. in the 1909 Challenge Cup Final during the 1908–09 season at Headingley Rugby Stadium, Leeds on Tuesday 20 April 1909, in front of a crowd of 23,587.

County Cup Final appearances
Ernest Bennett played , i.e. number 2, in Wakefield Trinity's 8-2 victory over Huddersfield in the 1910 Yorkshire County Cup Final during the 1910–11 season at Headingley Rugby Stadium, Leeds on Saturday 3 December 1910.

Notable tour matches
Ernest Bennett played , i.e. number 2, and scored a try in Wakefield Trinity's 20-13 victory over Australia in the 1908–09 Kangaroo tour of Great Britain match at Belle Vue, Wakefield on Saturday 19 December 1908.

Other notable appearances
Ernest Bennett played in The Rest's 5-7 defeat by Leeds in the 1901–02 Yorkshire Senior Competition Champions versus The Rest match at Headingley Rugby Stadium, Leeds on Saturday 19 April 1902.

Club career
Ernest Bennett made his début for Wakefield Trinity during December 1898, he appears to have scored no drop-goals (or field-goals as they are currently known in Australasia), but prior to the 1974–75 season all goals, whether; conversions, penalties, or drop-goals, scored 2-points, consequently prior to this date drop-goals were often not explicitly documented, therefore '0' drop-goals may indicate drop-goals not recorded, rather than no drop-goals scored. In addition, prior to the 1949–50 season, the archaic field-goal was also still a valid means of scoring points.

Genealogical Information
Ernest Bennett's marriage to Mary (née Hampshire) was on 29 December 1909 in Wakefield district. They had children; Cecil H. Bennett (birth registered during fourth ¼ 1914 in Wakefield district). Ernest Bennett was the son of Wakefield Trinity rugby union footballer who played in the 1870s Thomas Oliver Bennett, and the maternal grandfather of the Featherstone Rovers and Wakefield Trinity rugby league footballer who played in the 1950s and 1960s, Donald "Don" Metcalfe.

References

External links

Search for "Bennett" at rugbyleagueproject.org

1879 births
1921 deaths
English rugby league players
Rugby league players from Wakefield
Place of death missing
Rugby league wingers
Wakefield Trinity players
Yorkshire rugby league team players